Hanep Buhay ( is a Philippine television informative show broadcast by GMA Network. Hosted by Love Añover and Chris Tiu, it premiered on November 13, 2010. The show concluded in 2011.

It featured how to manage funds properly, start and set up a business and make better financial decisions.

References

External links
 

2010 Philippine television series debuts
2011 Philippine television series endings
Filipino-language television shows
GMA Network original programming
GMA Integrated News and Public Affairs shows
Philippine television shows